William Rowlands may refer to:

 William Rowlands (Australian cricketer) (1904–1984), Australian cricketer
 William Rowlands (English cricketer) (1883–1948), English cricketer
 William Rowlands (Gwilym Lleyn) (1802–1865), Welsh bibliographer and Methodist minister
 William Bowen Rowlands (1837–1906), British politician and member of parliament
 William Penfro Rowlands (1860–1937), Welsh schoolteacher and composer

See also
 William Rowland (disambiguation)